Bhaktamal, written , is a poem in the Braj language that gives short biographies of more than 200 bhaktas. It was written by Nabha Dass, a saint belonging to the tradition of Ramananda. Though considered a hagiography by some, the work recounts no miraculous events, and is widely believed to be an unbiased account of bhaktas across all sectarian paths. The Bhaktamal gives the earliest reliable account of many bhaktas, and hence is considered an important source for literary and devotional history of northern India.

Commentaries, translations and adaptations
 Hindi commentary titled Bhaktirasbodhini by Priyadas in 1712.
 A Rajasthani adaptation, Dadupanthi Bhaktamal by Raghavdas in 1720. This work gives biographies of 1200 saints of the Dadupanthi order.
 A Gurmukhi commentary, by Bhai Gurdas in the eighteenth century.
 Hindi commentary Bhaktamalpradipan in Persian manuscript by Tulsiram in the eighteenth century.
 A Bengali adaptation, Bhaktamal by Loldas in eighteenth century.
 Hindi translation titled Bhaktakalpadruma by Pratap Sinha in the nineteenth century.
 Hindi translation titled Shri Bhaktamal: Tika, Tilak, aur Namavali Sahit by Sitaramsharan Bhagavan Prasad in 1903.

References

Bhakti movement
Hindi-language literature
Medieval Indian literature